Jorge Mas Santos (born 1963) is an American billionaire businessman and the chairman and largest shareholder of MasTec, a Miami-based construction and engineering company, founded by his father Jorge Mas Canosa. 

Mas is also chairman of the Cuban American National Foundation and managing owner of Inter Miami CF, a Miami-based Major League Soccer team. He is also president of Real Zaragoza, a spanish football club. As of April 2022, his net worth was estimated at US$1.0 billion.

Education
Mas attended and graduated from the University of Miami, where he obtained a bachelor's degree in business administration in 1984 and a master's degree in business administration in 1985 from the University of Miami School of Business.

Business
Mas is the chairman of MasTec (NYSE:MTZ), a company founded by his father. He began his career at Church and Tower, MasTec’s predecessor, in 1984.

In 1990, Mas co-founded Neff Corporation (NYSE:NFF) a provider of rental construction and utility equipment. In 2005, it was sold for a reported $510 million.

He is the managing partner of a private equity group with investments in the fields of aviation, banking, commercial real estate, healthcare, and fixed income trading market makers. He has been on over a dozen corporate boards and has lectured on topics relating to entrepreneurship, corporate strategy and how to develop and motivate leadership teams.

Cuban American National Foundation
Mas is chairman of the Cuban American National Foundation (CANF), founded by his father in 1981. Mas has taken a more moderate position on Cuba than did his father, a vehement opponent of Castro.

Philanthropy
He is executive director of the Mas Family Foundation, which manages a $5 million endowment.

Personal life
He is married to Aleyda. They have three children and reside in Miami.

References

American businesspeople
Living people
1963 births
American billionaires
Businesspeople from Miami
Christopher Columbus High School (Miami-Dade County, Florida) alumni